Pescadores de perlas, also known as Sol de gloria is a 1938 Mexican film starring Sara García.

External links
  also starring Victoria Blanco and Victor Manuel Mendoza and Angel T. Sala

1938 films
1930s Spanish-language films

Mexican black-and-white films
Mexican drama films
1938 drama films
1930s Mexican films